The Noyo River Bridge is a box girder bridge constructed of prestressed concrete crossing the Noyo River in Fort Bragg, California. Owned and maintained by the California Department of Transportation, it carries motor vehicle, bicycle and pedestrian traffic over the waterway as part of California State Route 1, which is also signed as Main Street within the Fort Bragg city limits. Construction on the current bridge began in 2002 and was completed in August 2005, now the sixth such structure to span the river near its mouth and bear the name Noyo River Bridge, replacing a two-lane steel deck truss bridge built in 1948.

In comparison, the deck width of the Golden Gate Bridge is only .

Predecessors 
The current bridge is the sixth crossing to have been built at the mouth of the Noyo River. Only the two most recent iterations have been high-span designs, carrying traffic above Noyo Cove at the same elevation as the coastal bluffs on which the majority of the city is located. The distance between the two sides at the cove is over 800 feet, though the river below is less than 100 feet wide. Prior to the first bridge being built in 1861, river crossings were made on a cable ferry which also operated at the same narrow point in the channel.

Railings 

Noyo River Bridge served as the impetus for CalTrans approving an entirely new design specification for bridge railings, one that preserved the sightlines for motorists and passengers to a far greater degree than any approved for use in the state for over 50 years. This prompted a local outcry and attention from the California Coastal Commission who worked with CalTrans for over two years on alternatives that preserved sightlines without negatively impacting safety tests, ultimately resulting in an entirely new "scenic bridge" railing design termed ST-10 being approved for use state-wide and installed on the new Noyo Bridge.

In popular culture 
The  bridge can be seen in the movies Johnny Belinda, Overboard, The Russians Are Coming, the Russians Are Coming, and Dying Young. It is also shown in multiple episodes of Murder, She Wrote.

References

External links 
 
 

Box girder bridges
Bridges in Mendocino County, California
Road bridges in California
California State Route 1